Lakshkerala State Horticulture Mission is a registered society set up under the Travancore Cochin Literary Scientific & Charitable Societies Registration Act, 1955 to implement the National Horticulture Mission program, a centrally sponsored scheme, introduced during the financial year 2005-2006. This scheme envisages an end to end development of the horticulture sector covering production, post harvest management, processing and marketing.

Mission 
 Discovering new knowledge and developing useful methods, applications, and understandings.
 This should be a media where the new information and experience is dispatched and shared with the growers.
National Horticulture Mission has been launched as a Central Sector Scheme to promote holistic growth of the Horticulture sector through an area based regionally differentiated strategies. The scheme will be fully funded by the Kerala Government and different components proposed for implementation will be financially supported on the scales laid down.

References

External links 
 Official Web Site: State Horticulture Mission Kerala [http://nhm.nic.in/ National Horticulture Mission of India
 Dept of Agriculture, Government of Kerala

Horticultural organisations based in India
State agencies of Kerala
Economy of Kerala
Organizations established in 2005
2005 establishments in Kerala
Organisations based in Thiruvananthapuram